Kyun-u may refer to several places in Burma:

Kyun-u, Bhamo in Kachin State
Kyun-u, Homalin in Sagaing Region